Edvarð Júlíus Sólnes (born 22 March 1937) is an Icelandic politician and former government minister.

External links 
 Non auto-biography of Edvarð Júlíus Sólnes on the parliament website

|-

|-

References

1937 births
Edvard Julius Solnes
Living people
Edvard Julius Solnes
Environment ministers of Iceland